USS Skimmer is a name used more than once by the United States Navy:

 , a coastal minesweeper placed in service on 26 August 1941.
 , commissioned on 28 September 1944.

United States Navy ship names